Tito J. Wooten (born December 12, 1971 in Goldsboro, North Carolina) is a retired American football safety in the National Football League for the New York Giants and Indianapolis Colts from 1994 to 1999.

Wooten was selected by the New York Giants in the fourth round of the 1994 NFL Draft. Wooten also played for the Indianapolis Colts. During his NFL career, he played in 83 games, starting 47, as a free safety.

References

1971 births
Living people
People from Goldsboro, North Carolina
American football safeties
Houston Cougars football players
New York Giants players
Indianapolis Colts players